Kostas or Costas is a Greek given name and surname. As a given name it is the hypocorism for Konstantinos (Constantine).

Given name
 Costas Andreou, Greek musician
 Kostas Antetokounmpo (born 1997), a Greek basketball player
 Costas Azariadis (born 1943), Greek economist
 Kostas Biris (1899–1980), Greek architect
 Costas Georgiou (1951–1976), Greek Cypriot mercenary
 Kostas Lazarides (born 1949), aka Kostas (songwriter), Greek-American country music songwriter
 Costas Mandylor (born 1965), Greek Australian actor
 Kostas Papanikolaou (born 1990), Greek basketball player
 Costas Rigas (born 1944), Greek basketball player
 Costas Simitis (born 1936), former Prime Minister of Greece
 Kostas Hatzichristos (1921–2001), Greek actor
 Kostas Karamanlis (born 1956), former Prime Minister of Greece
 Kostas Koufogiorgos (born 1972), Greek-German cartoonist

Surname
 Bob Costas (born 1952), American sportscaster and talk show host
 John P. Costas (engineer) (1923–2008), American engineer
 John P. Costas (business) (born 1957), American businessman, banker and trader
 Jon Costas (born 1957), American politician
 William P. Costas (1927–2013), American businessman and politician

See also
 Costa (disambiguation)
 Costa's hummingbird
 Costal (disambiguation)
 Kostas (film)
 Kostis (disambiguation)

Given names of Greek language origin
Greek masculine given names
Greek-language surnames
Surnames